Code Name: Emerald is a 1985 action-drama film about a spy for the Allies working undercover in Nazi Germany during World War II. The film was directed by Jonathan Sanger, and stars Ed Harris, Max von Sydow, Eric Stoltz, and Patrick Stewart. It was the first theatrical film produced by NBC.

Premise
During World War II and a few months prior to the Normandy landings, Gus Lang, an Allied agent, is sent to occupied France in order to rescue an "overlord" captured by the Germans - one of the key people with intimate knowledge of when and where the D-Day invasion will actually occur. Several people will help him to succeed: a secret friend of the Allies, a vital German officer who is a highly placed mole, and the French resistance. The SS, however, will try to block their plans.

Plot
World War II, year 1944. Nazi Germany knows the Allies will launch Operation Overlord - an all-out invasion of Nazi-occupied Europe via France. To learn the actual date of D-Day and landing sites in advance, a cordial but uneasy partnership has been created between the German army (Col. Brausch (Max von Sydow)), the Gestapo (Hoffman (Horst Buchholz)) and the S.S. (Ritter (Helmut Berger)), with Hoffman in charge. Six times so far they've failed to capture an "Overlord" i.e. someone who knows the information they want, and the pressure is on. Brausch tells Hoffman they have an agent working in British Intelligence, codenamed Emerald (Gus Lang (Ed Harris)), whom they then task with delivering to them an "Overlord". But Lang/Emerald is really a double-agent who is working for the Allies. Patrick Callaghan, who is motivated by money, is Lang's contact with Brausch. Lang passes on fake details of a D-Day rehearsal including a ship carrying Overlorders, and suggests that a German E-boat squadron (heavily armed fast attack boats) should intercept them. Because Lang has invented the information, the E-boats will miss the ship but Lang would still appear to have fulfilled his mission. However, Lang's superior, Col. Peters (Patrick Stewart), says they will send a real ship, manned by unknowing sacrifices and certainly no Overlorders. Allied military command decides to hold a real D-Day rehearsal, for Omaha Beach, which naturally would include many Overlords. Peters refuses to inform the military of his intelligence scheme, telling Lang that there's a high-level Nazi secretly working for the Allies (due to disaffection with Nazi ideology) whose identity must be protected at all costs. This means that the exercise is attacked by the German E-boats and many Overlorders are killed in action. Several soldiers are captured by the Germans, including Lt. Andy Wheeler (Eric Stoltz), a U.S. army signalman whose job means he has intimate knowledge of the D-Day landings including the date and targets.

Wheeler is taken for interrogation to an old castle in Paris which is the Gestapo H.Q. Wheeler refuses to reveal any information to Ritter, not even his name and rank; Ritter has only found out his prisoner's name and rank by interrogating the other captured prisoners, and deduced from his signalman's job that the Nazis have captured an Overlord at last. Brausch, Hoffman, Ritter decide to include Lang/Emerald closely in their team because Lang, having grown up in the USA, can befriend Wheeler and get him to talk. They also know that the British would like Lang involved, believing him to be their own agent. Thus the Germans feel they have the upper hand and merely wait for Lang to arrive in France. Before leaving England, Lang is instructed that if Wheeler has talked he must report it at once and Operation Overlord would be delayed, and it would take months before it could be mounted again. Lang is also ordered that, if Wheeler hasn't yet talked, he may need to kill Wheeler to prevent him from talking. To keep Wheeler from being tortured, British Intelligence tells Lang they have contrived to add a false medical condition into Wheeler's army medical record. This medical condition (cardiac arrhythmia) can't be easily diagnosed. Lang "procures" Wheeler's medical record for the Nazis who do not torture Wheeler.

Lang parachutes into France where fishmonger Henri, a member of the French Resistance, meets him cycling to Paris. Henri drives him to Paris in his fish van and instructs him how to make contact with someone who will act as a go-between for him (Lang) and the radio operator who will secretly relay his reports to England. In Paris, Lang reports to Ritter. Ritter is fanatical about the racial inferiority of the Jews, and Lang avoids possibly awkward questioning on the matter by the arrival of Brausch and Hoffman. Ritter, Lang, Hoffman and Brausch agree on the interrogation method - Wheeler has been undergoing disorientation to soften him up for later, via enforced sleep deprivation, irregular meals and frequently being moved between different cells. Sometimes his cell has been occupied by another prisoner (a stool pigeon), sometimes he's in solitary confinement. Now they will introduce Lang as a fellow-American prisoner who must befriend Wheeler and persuade him to talk. In partly social, partly work conversation, it's suggested to Lang that he could acquire a girlfriend during his stay as he'll be working on Wheeler for only a few hours a day to begin with.

Lang evades his Gestapo tail in order to secretly meet Claire Jouvet (Cyrielle Clair) in a Paris Metro train carriage. For security, Lang will deal only with Claire, while Claire will pass on his reports to her Belgian friend who works for the Resistance and who has a secret radio hidden near the altar of a local church. Lang and Claire, knowing that Gestapo agents are following Lang all the time, pretend to be lovers although it develops into real romance. One night he stays overnight at Claire's apartment and they have sex for the first time, but are interrupted during the night by a disturbance downstairs - one of her neighbours, an elderly woman, is being arrested by the Germans as part of their tit-for-tat policy (20 people for 1 German). Claire protests but the German officer, to whom Lang has identified himself, apologises for disturbing them but warns that if they interfere he would have to report the matter. Lang drags a still-protesting Claire back to her apartment. The first time that Lang appears in Wheeler's cell, he starts befriending Wheeler by guessing that he's a Texan (yes, Wheeler says, adding that he's from Lubbock), and Wheeler soon introduces himself by name, and they converse about baseball - it looks as if Lang will be successful in obtaining the D-Day date, given time, and Brausch, Hoffman and Ritter celebrate.

Lang and Claire socialise with Brausch, Hoffman and Ritter and Ritter's lady-friend at a restaurant, and a photograph is taken of the group. Ritter, who is naturally suspicious, looks into the background of Claire Jouvet. She had told Lang that she has a son, a child by an absent father named Duchelle. Now Ritter arrests and questions Duchelle who reveals the friendship Claire has with a Belgian girl. Ritter orders a subordinate to obtain all the information Duchelle knows about Claire and then kill him. Ritter thus learns about Claire's connection with the Resistance and, as important for the Jew-hater, that an ancestor of Claire's 60 years ago had Jewish blood - Hoffman confides Ritter's actions to Brausch, saying that although not registering the Jewish blood is a capital offence, it is trivial.

Meanwhile, Lang gets Wheeler to reveal the D-Day landings will be at Calais (the decoy location being used by the Allies in Operation Quicksilver (deception plan)), but tells Brausch, Hoffman and Ritter that while Wheeler trusts him (Lang) he may have lied in case he was being overheard. Lang suggests some truly private time with Wheeler; everyone but Ritter thinks it is a good idea. Accordingly Lang and Wheeler are let into the open grounds of the castle for an hour's exercise. There Lang tells Wheeler he's a double agent, and allays Wheeler's fears by telling him what only an Overlorder would know - that D-Day will target Normandy (not Calais). Lang then gives Wheeler detailed instructions as to what information to reveal e.g. that the assault will be led by FUSAG in early July (actual D-Day was planned for 5 June; on 5 June it would be delayed to 6 June) [FUSAG was a non-existent and decoy U.S. army battalion based in Scotland]). Especially after Wheeler tells Lang that the thought of his girlfriend is all that keeps him going, Lang (no doubt thinking of his own girlfriend, Claire) determines to rescue Wheeler, ruling out killing him as per the in extremis order given him by Col. Peters and his superior Sir Geoffrey Macklin.

Hoffman's and Ritter's suspicions of Lang are increasing, however. Hoffman has a meeting with Callaghan, who has secretly started working for the Gestapo, because they pay better than Brausch. Callaghan tells Hoffman that Wheeler doesn't have a heart condition - the British altered Wheeler's army record but failed to change his ordinary medical record. Ritter shows Wheeler the photograph taken at the restaurant, and Wheeler recognises his buddy prisoner Lang in it. Ritter tells Wheeler he knows the American army faked his medical record and leaves him to contemplate the torture he can now expect. But Lang suddenly discovers a new ally - he secretly meets Brausch in a church and Brausch reveals that they have a mutual friend in Macklin i.e. Brausch is British Intelligence's high-ranking Nazi (mentioned but not named by Peters to Lang earlier). Brausch reveals what Hoffman had confided to him as to Gestapo suspicions of Claire and Lang, and that Callaghan was seen conversing with Hoffman. Brausch says that Hoffman will do something but will act alone as he never trusts anyone as it means no one can betray him, but it also means no one can help him either.

Hoffman, Lang and Claire go on a country picnic. Claire is painting a picture of the natural scene, while the chauffeur waits with the car that brought them. Hoffman invites Lang for a private walk and talk. Hoffman draws a gun and tells Lang that his cover is blown. Suddenly a shot rings out...and Hoffman falls dead - Claire has shot him. The surprised chauffeur starts to draw his weapon but he is felled too. Claire gets into the car and, after an emotional adieu to Lang, is driven by Henri to collect her son and then to an airfield, there to await Lang at 5pm and, hopefully, Wheeler once rescued. Later, at Gestapo H.Q., Lang, dressed in his Gestapo senior officer's uniform and acting very peremptory and very Nazi, hands Brausch a document which bears the signature of Hoffman. Actually it's a clever forgery by Claire who had practised earlier during one of the nights that Lang spent with her. Brausch, ordered by Lang to read the document to all the officers present, says that Hoffman is at Calais, removes Ritter's authority and puts Lang in charge with the task of bringing Wheeler to Calais at once. As soldiers bring in Wheeler, Ritter arrives having been alerted by one of the officers who had slipped out to warn him. Ritter and Lang exchange words and Lang asserts his authority by hitting him and flooring him. As he lies there and blood trickles from a cut on his mouth, Ritter sees Wheeler escorted away by Lang and Brausch. A suspicious officer rushes to a telephone, seeking personal confirmation from Hoffman of his orders. There is a delay (if nothing else, of course, Hoffman is not at Calais as he is dead), and the officer can only watch as Lang and Brausch slowly walk the exhausted Wheeler to the staff car. Once Wheeler is in the car, Lang tells Brausch to come with them but Brausch says he can buy them some time. Lang knows the Germans will figure out the plot, so Brausch's life is in danger, but Brausch says he is not important. Lang drives Wheeler out of Gestapo H.Q. just as the alarm is sounded. A chase ensues. Lang stops the car out in the countryside, and Henri appears with his fish van, and all three of them rush to the airfield. The Germans catch up with the staff car and start searching. At the airfield, the pilot of the rescue plane urges Claire to give up and leave as the rendezvous deadline looms. Claire and her young son get into the plane. At the last moment the fish van arrives and everyone gets onto the plane which takes off. Once in the air and heading for England, and having put paid to the pursuit, Lang and Claire kiss each other passionately, making Wheeler smile, no doubt thinking of his own girlfriend whom he'll soon see. The film ends with brief real footage and commentary of the D-Day landings on 6 June 1944.

Cast
Ed Harris as Augustus "Gus" Lang
Max von Sydow as Jurgen Brausch
Horst Buchholz as Walter Hoffman
Cyrielle Clair as Claire Jouvet
Helmut Berger as Ernst Ritter
Eric Stoltz as Lieutenant Andy Wheeler
Patrick Stewart as Col. Peters
Graham Crowden as Sir Geoffrey Macklin
George Mikell as Major Seltz
Julie Jézéquel as Jasmine
Katia Tchenko as Marie Claude
Vincent Grass as Tracker

References

External links
 
 

1985 films
1980s action drama films
1980s spy films
1980s war films
American spy films
American war drama films
Films scored by John Addison
Films set in 1944
Films set in France
Films shot in France
Metro-Goldwyn-Mayer films
NBC Productions films
Operation Overlord films
Films with screenplays by Ronald Bass
World War II spy films
1985 drama films
American World War II films
American drama television films
1980s English-language films
1980s American films